Rila Municipality is located in southeastern Kyustendil Province, Bulgaria. Its administrative centre is Rila. , the population was 3606.

Locations in Rila Municipality include:
 Padala
 Pastra
 Rila (administrative centre)
 Rila Monastery
 Smochevo

Several peaks higher than 2,000 metres are part of the municipality, including Rilets (2,731 m), Yosifitsa (2,697 m), Kanarata (2,619 m), Zliya Zab (2,678 m), Kalin (2,667 m), Elenin Vrah (2,654 m) and Tsarev Vrah (2,378 m). The municipality also boasts 28 mountain lakes. The area is also rich in medieval Bulgarian Orthodox churches and monasteries.

Demography

Religion 
According to the latest Bulgarian census of 2011, the religious composition, among those who answered the optional question on religious identification, was the following:

References

Municipalities in Kyustendil Province